Whinfield is a suburb of Darlington, in the ceremonial county of County Durham, England. It is situated to the north of the centre of Darlington. Facilities within the community include a doctor's surgery and pharmacy, two local public houses (the Shuttle and Loom, and the Springfield) and an Asda supermarket.

Transport
Originally several bus routes (by different companies) called in the Whinfield area. However, now Arriva North East routes 6A/6B, 10, 17 and X66 operate to the Town Centre after the controversial re-shuffle of bus timetables in Darlington which abolished the Skerne Park and Firth Moor bus services from Whinfield.

Education
Schools within the area include Whinfield Primary School (for students aged 4–11) and the Education Village. The EV is the first of its kind in the world, linking three schools on one site, Haughton Academy (for students aged 11–16), Springfield Academy (for students aged 3–11) and Beaumont Hill Academy (for students aged 2–19 with special needs).

Villages in County Durham
Suburbs of Darlington
Places in the Tees Valley